Zollingeria dongnaiensis is a species of plant in the family Sapindaceae. It is considered medicinal, and is easy to germinate. 
It is used in soaps, shampoos, and cosmetics.
It is found in Thailand and Vietnam.

References

dongnaiensis
Data deficient plants
Taxonomy articles created by Polbot